USS Cronin (DE/DEC-704) was a Buckley-class destroyer escort in service with the United States Navy from 1944 to 1946 and from 1951 to 1953. She was sunk as a target in 1971.

History
Cronin was the second U.S. Navy ship named for Chief Gunner Cornelius Cronin (1838–1912), who was awarded the Medal of Honor for his "coolness and close attention to duty" in the Battle of Mobile Bay.

Cronin was launched on 5 January 1944 at the Defoe Shipbuilding Company in Bay City, Michigan, sponsored by Mrs. E. B. Cronin, daughter-in-law of the late Chief Gunner Cronin.  She was commissioned on 5 May 1944.

World War II
Cronin departed New York on 21 July to escort a convoy to Bizerte, Tunisia, returning to Norfolk, Virginia on 7 September.  A second convoy escort voyage from 2 October to 18 November during which she rescued 24 survivors from SS George W. McKnight on 14 October took her to Palermo, Sicily.  On 16 December, she departed New York for the Pacific, arriving at Manus Island on 22 January 1945.

Assigned to the Philippine Sea Frontier, Cronin operated out of Leyte on convoy escort duty until the end of World War II.  On 30 August, she departed Manila for Okinawa.  From this base, she supported the re-occupation of the Chinese mainland, escorted transports to Jinsen, Korea, screened the escort carrier Bougainville (CVE-100) which was delivering planes at Taku and Tsingtao, and escorted an LST convoy to Jinsen.  She departed Okinawa on 8 November for Boston, Massachusetts, arriving there on 15 December.  Cronin arrived at Green Cove Springs, Florida, on 19 January 1946, and was placed out of commission in reserve there on 31 May 1946.  She was reclassified DEC-704, on 13 September 1950.

Cold War
Recommissioned on 9 February 1951, Cronin took part in major exercises in the Atlantic, and operated out of Norfolk on training duty that included exercises at Key West with submarines in March 1953.  Cronin returned to Green Cove Springs on 24 September 1953

Decommissioning and fate
Cronin was again placed out of commission in reserve on 4 December 1953. She was reclassified back to DE-704 on 27 December 1957. On 16 December 1971, Cronin was towed out to sea and sunk as an aircraft target. Her final resting place is listed at 31° 43' N., 76° 15' W.

Awards 
Cronin was awarded the American Campaign Medal, Asiatic-Pacific Campaign Medal, and European-African-Middle Eastern Campaign Medals for her World War II service.  She also received the Navy Occupation Service Medal and the China Service Medal for her operations in the Far East following the close of the war.

References

External links  

   navsource.org: USS Cronin
 hazegray.org: USS Cronin

Buckley-class destroyer escorts
Ships built in Bay City, Michigan
1944 ships